Philo was a Greek poet and writer. He was a Hellenistic Jewish author of an epic poem in Greek hexameters on the history of Jerusalem. He lived at an earlier date than Philo the philosopher. Alexander Polyhistor (c. 105-35 B.C.) quotes several passages of the poem, and is the source of the extracts in Eusebius (Praeparatio evangelica, ix. 20, 24, 37). This is probably the Philo who is mentioned by Clemens Alexandrinus (Strom, i. 21, 141) and by Josephus (Contra Apionem, i. 23), who calls him "the elder".

Notes

References
 This work in turn cites:
M. Philippson, Ezechiel des jüdischen Trauerspieldichters Auszug aus Egypten und Philo des Aelteren Jerusalem (Berlin, 1830).

Further reading
 This work in turn cites Philippson and:
Karl Wilhelm Ludwig Müller, Fragmenta Historicorum Graecorum, iii, 213 sq.

Hellenistic Jewish writers
Hellenistic poets
Jewish poets
1st-century BCE Jews